
Gmina Gózd is a rural gmina (administrative district) in Radom County, Masovian Voivodeship, in east-central Poland. Its seat is the village of Gózd, which lies approximately 15 kilometres (9 mi) east of Radom and 98 km (61 mi) south of Warsaw.

Villages
Gmina Gózd contains the villages and settlements of Drożanki, Gózd, Grzmucin, Karszówka, Kiedrzyn, Kłonów, Kłonówek, Klwatka Królewska, Kuczki-Kolonia, Kuczki-Wieś, Lipiny, Małęczyn, Niemianowice, Piskornica, Podgóra and Wojsławice.

Neighbouring gminas
Gmina Gózd is bordered by the city of Radom and by the gminas of Jedlnia-Letnisko, Pionki, Skaryszew, Tczów and Zwoleń.

References
 Polish official population figures 2006

Gozd
Radom County